Cabot may refer to:

Businesses
 Cabot Corporation, an American chemicals company 
 Cabot Creamery, an American dairy cooperative

Fictional characters
 Alexandra Cabot, in the Law & Order universe
 Leigh Cabot, from Stephen King's 1983 novel Christine
 Rosanna Cabot, in the soap opera As the World Turns
 Tarl Cabot, protagonist of Gor novels
 William Cabot, in the film The Sum of All Fears
 Ephraim Cabot, in the play Desire Under the Elms by Eugene O'Neill

People
 Cabot family, of the Boston Brahmins, or "first families of Boston"
 Bruce Cabot (1904–1972), American actor
 Dolce Ann Cabot (1862–1943), New Zealand journalist, newspaper editor, feminist and teacher
 John Cabot (c. 1450 – c. 1499), Italian navigator and explorer, father of Sebastian Cabot
 Godfrey Lowell Cabot (1861-1962), American industrialist who founded the Cabot Corporation
 George Cabot (1752–1823), American merchant, seaman, and politician
 John Moors Cabot (1901–1981), American diplomat and ambassador, son of Godfrey Lowell Cabot
 Meg Cabot (born 1967), American author 
 Pilar Cabot (1940–2017), Catalan writer
 Richard Clarke Cabot (1868–1939), American physician and pioneer in social work
 Sebastian Cabot (actor) (1918–1977), British actor
 Sebastian Cabot (explorer) (c. 1474 – c. 1557), Italian explorer of the Americas, son of John Cabot
 Susan Cabot (1927–1986), American actress
 Cabot Rea, American reporter and TV news anchorman
 Thomas Dudley Cabot, American businessman and conservationist

Places

Canada
 Cabot Head, in Ontario
 Cabot Square, Montreal
 Cabot Strait, between Newfoundland and Nova Scotia
 Cabot Trail, a highway in Nova Scotia
 Cabot Tower (St. John's), Newfoundland

United States
 Cabot, Arkansas
 Cabot, Pennsylvania
 Cabot, Vermont
 Cabot (village), Vermont
 Cabot House, Harvard University
 Mount Cabot, in New Hampshire

United Kingdom
 Cabot, Bristol
 Cabot Square, London 
 Cabot Hall
 Cabot Tower, Bristol, England

Other uses
 USS Cabot, several ships of the U.S. Navy
 Cabot 36, a Canadian sailboat

See also

Cabot, Cabot & Forbes, a real estate management firm in Boston, U.S.
 Cabot rings, thin strands found in red blood cells
 Annie Cabbot, colleague of the fictional Inspector Alan Banks
 Bingham v. Cabot (disambiguation), two Supreme Court of the United States opinions